

First Congregational Church is an historic Congregational church located at 630 Ohio Street in Terre Haute, Vigo County, Indiana. It was built in 1902-1903 and is the second building to house the congregation founded in December 1834.  It is a neo-Gothic-style church constructed of buff-colored brick with limestone trim and opalescent glass windows.

FCC was added to the National Register of Historic Places in 1983.

Covenant 
In the Love of Truth and in the Spirit of Jesus Christ, We Unite for the Worship of God and the Service to Humanity. We agree to differ... We resolve to love... We unite to serve...

Organization 
FCC is a member of the National Association of Congregational Christian Churches (NACCC) and the Midwest Association of Congregational Christian Churches.

References

Congregational churches in Indiana
Churches on the National Register of Historic Places in Indiana
Gothic Revival church buildings in Indiana
1834 establishments in Indiana
Churches completed in 1903
Buildings and structures in Terre Haute, Indiana
National Register of Historic Places in Terre Haute, Indiana
Churches in Vigo County, Indiana